Federico Moccia (born 20 July 1963) is an Italian writer, screenwriter and film director. His father Giuseppe Moccia was also a screenwriter and director. Following his successful book and film  many people put love padlocks on Ponte Milvio in Rome and other places around the world. From 2011 until 2027 he has been the mayor of Rosello, a town in Abruzzo.

Biography 

He is the son of Italian scriptwriter and movie director Giuseppe Moccia, and his childhood was linked to the world of cinema through his father, which he wrote in several Italian comedies of the 70s and 80s. It started in the world of work from his father at age 19 as assistant director Attila flagello di Dio (1982). Five years later he directed his first film, Palla al centro, but the lack of success he had caused Moccia wrote screenplays and directed several series.
In 1992 he wrote his first novel  which was rejected by several publishers and released in a small edition by Il Ventaglio publishing house.
Again without success, in 1996 wrote and directed the film  and returned to the world of television. In 2004, twelve years after its first edition, Three Meters Above Heaven had a reissue, becoming a bestseller and a same title movie, also receiving several awards and translations into several languages (also Portuguese and Japanese).
In 2006 he published I Want You, sequel to the previous novel, which was so successful that it was decided, again, to adapt it to film.

In 2017 he wrote  which was the last book of the series of Three Meters Above Heaven. Summertime, a TV show based on the same series, premiered on Netflix in 2020.

He considers himself Roman Catholic.

Selected bibliography 
 Tre metri sopra il cielo , (1992)
 Ho voglia di te , (2006; English: I Want You)
 Scusa ma ti chiamo amore , (2007) 
 Cercasi Niki disperatamente , (2007)
 Amore 14 , (2008)
 Scusa ma ti voglio sposare , (2009)

Films 
Director
 Palla al centro (1987)
 College (1990)
 Classe mista 3ª A (1996)
 Scusa ma ti chiamo amore (2008), based on his novel of the same name
 Scusa ma ti voglio sposare (2009), based on his novel of the same name
 Amore 14 (2010), based on his novel of the same name
 Universitari (2013)
 Non c'è campo (2017)

Screenwriter
 I ragazzi della 3ª C (1987-1989) – TV series
 Cannibal Holocaust II (1988)
 College (1990) – TV series
 Tre metri sopra il cielo (2004)
 Ho voglia di te (2006)
 Scusa ma ti chiamo amore (2008) 
 Scusa ma ti voglio sposare (2009)
 Amore 14 (2010)
 Universitari (2013)
 Non c'è campo (2017)

References

External links

 Official website

1963 births
Living people
20th-century Italian novelists
20th-century Italian male writers
21st-century Italian novelists
21st-century Italian male writers
Italian Roman Catholics